Sick 'Em is an album by Seattle punk rock band 7 Year Bitch. It was released in October 1992 on the local C/Z Records label and collected all of the band's previous releases up to that point. The album was originally slated for an earlier release date but was delayed following the death of guitarist Stefanie Sargent in June 1992.

Critical reception
Trouser Press called the album "a fairly primitive and monochromatic burst of punk rage."

Track listing 
All songs by Selene Vigil and Elizabeth Davis, except where noted.
 Chow Down -  3:03
 Tired of Nothing -  2:14
 Knot	 -  5:08
 In Lust You Trust (Vigil/Stephanie Sargent/Davis) -  3:25
 Sink (Vigil/Sargent) -  3:19
 Gun (Davis/Sargent) -  2:16
 Lorna -	 1:56
 You Smell Lonely - 2:03
 No Fucking War (Vigil/Sargent/Davis/Valerie Agnew) - 1:53
 Dead Men Don't Rape  (Vigil/Agnew/Davis) - 2:47
 8-Ball Deluxe	 -  2:52
 Can We Laugh Now? (Thatcher on Acid) - 2:32

Tracks #1-6 are from 1992 10-inch EP Chow Down
Tracks #7-9 are from 1991 7-inch single Lorna / No Fuckin' War / You Smell Lonely
Tracks #10-11 are from 1992 7-inch EP Antidisestablishmentarianism
Track #12 is from 1992 split 7-inch No Fuckin' War / Can We Laugh Now with Thatcher On Acid

Personnel
 Selene Vigil — vocals
 Stefanie Sargent — guitar 
 Elizabeth Davis — bass
 Valerie Agnew — drums

References

7 Year Bitch albums
1992 debut albums
C/Z Records albums